

Texas state forests and arboretums

See also
 List of U.S. National Forests

Lists of state forests in the United States
Texas geography-related lists